Corruption in Singapore is generally perceived as one of the lowest in the world. Cases are mostly handled by the Singapore Corrupt Practices Investigation Bureau (CPIB), a government agency in Singapore that investigates and prosecutes corruption in the public and private sectors. According to a Transparency International survey, an overwhelming majority of people in Singapore do not hear cases of corruption by public officials or institutions through media in their lifetime. In 2020, Singapore's public sector was ranked as the fourth least corrupt in the world and the most transparent in Asia.

Overview
Transparency International's 2022 Corruption Perceptions Index ranks the country in 5th place out of 180 countries, where a low number corresponds to a perception of little corruption in the country's public sector. According to the "Government Defence Anti-Corruption Index" the highest corruption risk area is "Operations" followed by "Finance".

Business executives surveyed in the World Economic Forum's 2014–2015 Global Competitiveness Report reported no problems doing business in Singapore.

The political reasoning behind why Singaporean corruption is generally immensely low is due to the fact that compared to neighboring nations such as Thailand and Malaysia, a theory that the powers of the state were able to pressure private interests into funneling capital into sectors that would ultimately benefit the public in the long term.

Indicators of corruption

Case studies

Notable case studies
There are case studies in both public and private sectors.

SLA (2011)
Former Singapore Land Authority (SLA) deputy director of technology and infrastructure, Koh Seah Wee, and former SLA manager, Christopher Lim Chai Meng, were sentenced to jail by the High Court on cheating and money laundering charges. Koh was sentenced to 22 years of jail after admitting to 59 charges and Lim was sentenced to 15 years imprisonment after admitting to 49 charges. Of the $12.2 million laundered, $7.5 million was recovered from Koh. Koh and Lim cheated SLA by using false invoices issued by ex-swim coach Ho Yen Teck who set up seven sole proprietorships to provide fake IT maintenance services and goods that were not delivered. Ho was jailed for 10 years for the conspiracy.

SCDF and CNB (2012)
In January 2012, two senior civil servants were arrested under graft charges. Former head of the Singapore Civil Defence Force (SCDF), Peter Lim Sin Pang, was arrested on 19 December 2011, while Central Narcotics Bureau (CNB) chief, Ng Boon Gay, was taken in for questioning on 4 January 2012. Both men were arrested in connection with the Prevention of Corruption Act relating to an IT contract, and in late January 2012, it was announced that both men are also facing disciplinary action by the Public Service Commission, which oversees the conduct of civil servants. After being interdicted, a step only taken when an individual “faces serious offences for which 'criminal proceedings or proceedings for his dismissal or reduction in rank are being contemplated'”, the case provoked comment from Prime Minister Lee Hsien Loong who promised to punish both men if they are guilty of misconduct. The CPIB's silence on this investigation came under the scrutiny of a number of MPs during a parliamentary sitting in February 2012. Deputy Prime Minister and Minister for Home Affairs, Teo Chee Hean then defended the CPIB, stating that any announcement on the outcome of the probe would have been premature and may have compromised the investigation. He also assured concerned MPs that all the findings of the investigation would be publicly reported once they had been finalised. Peter Lim Sin Pang was dismissed from service in August 2013 after the court verdict and found guilty, whereas Ng Gay took an early  retirement after the court verdict is a discharge amounting to an acquittal.

NParks (2012)
In July 2012, National Parks Board's (NParks) purchase of 26 Brompton bikes costing $2,200 each sparked a nationwide uproar after it was revealed by a whistleblower on online forum HardwareZone of possible corruption due numerous red flags in the way the procurement was done. Khaw, who initially defended NPark's purchase of the high-end foldable bikes, was criticised for handling the saga poorly. Subsequent investigation by the Corrupt Practices Investigation Bureau (CPIB) resulted in National Parks Board assistant director Bernard Lim Yong Soon's dismissal and being fined $5,000 for lying to auditors about his relationship with the bicycle firm which was awarded the tender.

CPIB (2013)
On 23 July 2013, CPIB assistant director Edwin Yeo Seow Hiong was charged with misappropriating at least $1.7 million from the anti-graft agency between 2008 and 2012. Yeo was interdicted from his position as head of field research and technical support at CPIB to assist in a Commercial Affairs Department (CAD) probe into his suspected financial impropriety. Eight of the charges were for misappropriating funds and criminal breach of trust, one was for forgery and the rest were in using part of his ill-gotten gains to gamble at the Marina Bay Sands (MBS) casino. On 20 February 2014, Yeo was sentenced to 10 years jail.

MFA (2014)
On 20 February 2014, former Ministry of Foreign Affairs (MFA) protocol chief Lim Cheng Hoe, 61, was sentenced to 15 months' jail for cheating. From February 2008 to May 2012, Lim made false claims for $89,000 worth of pineapple tarts and wine as gifts for foreign diplomats.

Ang Mo Kio Town Council (2016)
General manager and secretary of Ang Mo Kio Town Council (AMKTC), Victor Wong Chee Meng, was removed from his position and placed under investigation by CPIB, after a complaint was lodged in September 2016 over "the way he handles contracts and dealings in the town council". Wong, a Public Service Medal recipient, was concurrently an employee of CPG Facilities Management, which is the appointed managing agent of the town council. On 14 March 2018, Wong is charged with 55 counts of corruption offence for receiving some $107,000 in bribes from Chia Sin Lan and Yip Fong Yin, directors of two building and repair companies. Wong and Chia pleaded guilty halfway through the trail and were sentenced to 27 months and 21 months respectively. Both of them appealed and had their sentences increased to 39 months and 33 months respectively.

Keppel Corporation (2017)
According to US prosecutors, Keppel’s offshore and marine arm, Keppel O&M, agreed to pay a US$422 million settlement to avoid a criminal trial for bribing Brazilian officials. Court documents released by the US justice department revealed that Keppel O&M paid US$55 million in bribes between 2001 and 2014, to win 13 contracts with Petrobras and Sete Brasil – two Brazilian oil companies deeply mired in the country's wide-ranging Operation Car Wash graft scandal. Keppel Corporation is one of the Government-Linked Companies (GLCs) under Temasek Holdings. It was the biggest corruption case involving a GLC in Singapore's history. 

CPIB started investigations on the six former Keppel O&M employees who are involved in the case. Investigations was closed in 2023 due to insufficient evidence and the inability to summon key witnesses from other countries. Six former Keppel O&M employees were warned in lieu of prosecution.

Republic of Singapore Air Force (RSAF) (2018)
Rajkumar Padmanathan, 49, was jailed 25 months and six weeks on 27 July 2018 for 28 counts of corruption, cheating and breaching the Official Secrets Act while working at Tengah Air Base and Sembawang Air Base. He leaked tender quotations in order to secure contracts for companies set up by his wife, Jayashree, friend, Jeevan Arumugam, and acquaintance, Kamal Kishore. The total value of contracts awarded to GAS, EFAS, Duratech and GTW set up for the scam was $1,817,379.87 over the period from 2008 to 2014.

See also 
 Crime in Singapore

Notes

References

 
Singapore